Robert Perless is an American artist whose particular focus is kinetic art sculptures.

Personal background 

Perless was born in Brooklyn, New York, in 1938. He studied Art and Engineering at the University of Miami in Florida.
In 1978 after working in cramped quarters in New York City, Perless determined to build an all-metal house and studio in Greenwich, Connecticut. He contracted architect John Ciardullo who designed a house and studio framed in steel, with aluminum exterior paneling, which Perless built himself, welding and erecting the structure and sculptural railings and cutting and hanging the exterior Alucobond panels. The large sculpture studio with 25 foot high ceilings is part of the main structure.

Kinetic Art 
Perless is part of the Kinetic Art movement.  He has created kinetic structures as public artworks for municipalities, post-secondary educational institutions as well as private sector commissioned art installations for various corporations. His works were discussed at the first International Kinetic Art Symposium February 9, 2013 in the presentation on the link between Kinetic Art and the generation of Electricity from the wind; They were also discussed  during the Breaking The Barriers panel discussion and detailed in the presentation following the panel discussion on how his 40 years of Kinetic Art works, lead to the development of small wind turbines for use in urban environments.

Body of work 

The works are created in his large Greenwich studio adjacent to his home, using  industrial materials. His works are inspired by early 20th-century modern sculptors, including the Russian Constructivists, the Italian Futurists, and European and American masters who used new materials and the concept of motion and speed in art and life.

Selected sculptures 
Orion's Belt, Corpus Christi, Texas.

Sun Dagger (2004), on the campus of Utah Valley University, Wasatch in Heber City, Utah.

Solar Wind, on the High Tech Campus of Salt Lake Community College.

Selected collections 

His works have been acquired by museums and public galleries including:
Aldrich Museum of Contemporary Art, Ridgefield, Connecticut
Boca Raton Museum of Art, Boca Raton, Florida
Oklahoma Art Center, University of Oklahoma,  
Phoenix Art Museum, Phoenix, Arizona
Stamford Museum & Nature Center, Stamford, Connecticut
Whitney Museum of American Art, New York City
William Benton Museum of Art, Storrs, Connecticut

Selected exhibitions 

Perless's work has been exhibited in solo and group shows, including:
2012		Sculptors Guild, Saks Fifth Avenue, New York, NY
2008		In-Site Governor’s Island, NY
2006		Robert Perless: Public Visions One-Man Show, Flinn Gallery, Greenwich, CT
2006		Sculpture in the Park, White Plains, NY
2004		Art Omi International Arts Center, Omi, New York
2003		Sculpture Now, Stockbridge, MS
2001		Space 2001, Bruce Museum, Greenwich, CT
2000		12X12X12, Greenwich Art Society
1997‘94‘87‘78  Aldrich Museum of Contemporary Art, Ridgefield, CT
1995		Environmental Sculptures, Kukje Gallery, Seoul, Korea.
1991 - 96	Andre Emmerich’s Top Gallant Farm Sculpture Garden, Quaker Hill, NY
1991 ‘92	Paris-New York-Kent Gallery, Kent, CT
1989		Connecticut Biennial Bruce Museum, Greenwich, CT
1980		Taft Museum, Cincinnati, Ohio
1976		Bonino Gallery, One-Man Show, New York, NY
1975		Forum Gallery, New York, NY
1972		Bernard Danenberg Gallery, One-Man Show, New York, NY
1970		Light, Motion, & Sound, Hudson River Museum, Yonkers, NY
1970		Eclectra ‘70 Pepsico, New York, NY
1970		Whitney Museum, New York, NY
1969		Galerie Simonne Stern, One-Man Show, New Orleans, LA
1968		Bodley Gallery, One-Man Show, New York, NY

References

External images 
Sculptors Guild Images of Perless' work
Works: Rainbow Monad, 2006 ; Molecular Exploration, 2002;  Molecule, 2002

Photos of Perless kinetic sculptures

External links 

 
 Ask Art Biographical Information

Living people
1938 births
20th-century American sculptors
20th-century American male artists
21st-century American sculptors
21st-century American male artists
American male sculptors
University of Miami alumni